Graham Corners is an unincorporated community located in the town of Forest, Fond du Lac County, Wisconsin, United States. The community was named after Allen N. Graham, who became the first postmaster in October 1900.

Notes

Unincorporated communities in Fond du Lac County, Wisconsin
Unincorporated communities in Wisconsin